The Tunda is a myth of the Pacific coastal region of Colombia and Ecuador, and particularly in the Afro-Colombian community of the Chocó department, about a shapeshifting entity, resembling a human female, that lures people into the forests and keeps them there.

It is capable of changing its shape to appear in the form of a loved one, as in the likeness of a child's mother, to lure its victims into the forest and feed them with shrimps (camarones peneídos) to keep them docile. This is called entundamiento and a person in this state is entundado(a).

Her shapeshifting abilities are said to be imperfect, as this doppelgänger of sorts would always have a wooden leg in the shape of a molinillo, or wooden kitchen utensil used to stir hot drinks such as chocolate or aguapanela. The monster, however, is very cunning when trying to hide this defect from its would-be victims. In other versions, it appears to male loggers or hunters working deep into the jungle as a beautiful woman that tries to lure a man away, so it can reveal its hideous nature and suck his blood and drink it or devour him as a wild animal like bears.

See also
Sayona
Patasola
Deer Woman
Sihuanaba
Baobhan sith
Leanan sídhe
Huldra
Soucouyant

References

External links
La leyenda de la Tunda
La Tunda se convierte en gallina
Leyenda: La Tunda de esmeraldas (with picture)

Mythological anthropophages
Spanish-language South American legendary creatures
Myths and legends of Colombia
South American mythology
Female legendary creatures
Forest spirits

Shapeshifting
Ecuadorian legends